Jules Roche (22 May 1841, Saint-Étienne - 8 April 1923) was a French politician. He was a member of the Chamber of Deputies from 1881 to 1919. He was Minister of Commerce and Industry from 1890 to 1892. Originally a member of the Republican Union, later on he joined the Republican Federation. On 3 July 1905 he voted against the Law on the Separation of the Churches and the State.

Principal positions 
 Mayor of Serrières
 Député du Var, 1881 – 1885
 Député de la Savoie, 1885 – 1898
 Député de l'Ardèche, 1898 – 1919
 Minister of Commerce, de l’Industrie et des Colonies, 17 March 1890 – 8 March 1892
 Minister of Commerce et de l’Industrie, 8 March 1892 – 6 December 1892

Publications 
 Le Budget des Cultes (1883)
 L’Allemagne et la France (1898)
 La politique économique de la France (1898)
 Finances et politique (1899) 
 Budgets du XIXe siècle et Questions diverses (1901)
 L’Impôt sur le Revenu, Discours Parlementaires, Quand serons-nous en République ? (1918)
 L’Alsace-Lorraine, terre française. (1918)

References

External links
 

1841 births
1923 deaths
Politicians from Saint-Étienne
Republican Union (France) politicians
Republican Federation politicians
French Ministers of Commerce and Industry
Members of the 3rd Chamber of Deputies of the French Third Republic
Members of the 4th Chamber of Deputies of the French Third Republic
Members of the 5th Chamber of Deputies of the French Third Republic
Members of the 6th Chamber of Deputies of the French Third Republic
Members of the 7th Chamber of Deputies of the French Third Republic
Members of the 8th Chamber of Deputies of the French Third Republic
Members of the 9th Chamber of Deputies of the French Third Republic
Members of the 10th Chamber of Deputies of the French Third Republic
Members of the 11th Chamber of Deputies of the French Third Republic